The 2008 NRMA Motoring + Services Grand Finale was the fourteenth and final race of the 2008 V8 Supercar season. It was held on the weekend of the 4 to 7 December at the Oran Park Raceway in New South Wales.

Qualifying 
Qualifying was held on Saturday 6 December 2008.

Race 1
Race 1 was held on Saturday 6 December 2008.

Race 2 
Race 2 was held on Sunday 7 December 2008.

Race 3
Race 3 was held on Sunday 7 December 2008.

Results

Qualifying

Standings
After round 14 of 14.

Support categories
The 2008 NRMA Motoring + Services Grand Finale had seven support categories.

References

External links
Official timing and results

NRMA Motoring and Services Grand Finale